Draw My Life is a type of internet video in which the author narrates their life history, set to a fast-motion video of the author drawing illustrations on a whiteboard of key figures and events in their life. Drawings can be as simple as stick figures, or fully fleshed-out, created digitally or digitised. Often, the videos reveal previously hidden upsetting or unfortunate histories or stories, and end in the author thanking their audience for aiding in their success.

The first video of its kind was posted to YouTube by Irish YouTuber and musician Bry in September 2011. The style of video became a popular trend on YouTube in 2013, when several other popular YouTube personalities began uploading such videos, some of which were featured in popular online news publications. Eventually, Draw My Life videos were created for fictional characters and non-YouTubers such as Harry Potter.

References

2010s YouTube videos
2011 in Internet culture
2013 in Internet culture
Whiteboard animation